Mayfield may refer to:

People
 Mayfield (surname)

Places

Australia
 Mayfield, New South Wales
 Mayfield, New South Wales (Queanbeyan-Palerang Regional Council)
 Mayfield, Tasmania

Canada
 Mayfield, Edmonton, a neighborhood in Alberta
 Mayfield, New Brunswick, an unincorporated community in Charlotte County
 Mayfield, Prince Edward Island, a community on Prince Edward Island Route 13
 Rural Municipality of Mayfield No. 406, Saskatchewan

Ireland
 Mayfield, County Kildare, Ireland
 Mayfield, Cork, Ireland
 Mayfield GAA, a Gaelic Athletic Association club

New Zealand
 Mayfield, Canterbury, a village in Canterbury
 Mayfield, Marlborough, a suburb of Blenheim

South Africa
 Mayfield, South Africa

United Kingdom
 Mayfield, East Sussex, England
 Mayfield, Edinburgh, Scotland
 Mayfield, Highland, a location in Scotland
 Mayfield, Midlothian, Scotland
 Mayfield, Northumberland, a location in England
 Mayfield, Staffordshire, England
 Mayfield, West Lothian, a location in Scotland (part of Armadale, West Lothian)
 Mayfield Playing Fields, Dundee, Scotland
 Manchester Mayfield railway station, Manchester, England

United States
 Mayfield, Arkansas
 Mayfield, California, annexed by the city of Palo Alto in 1925
 Its train station, now California Avenue station
 Mayfield, Delaware
 Mayfield (Middletown, Delaware), listed on the National Register of Historic Places in New Castle County, Delaware
 Mayfield, Georgia
 Mayfield, Kansas 
 Mayfield, Kentucky
 Mayfield, Baltimore, Maryland
 Mayfield, Michigan
 Mayfield (town), New York
 Mayfield (village), New York, within the town of Mayfield
 Mayfield, Ohio
 Mayfield, Oklahoma
 Mayfield, Pennsylvania 
 Mayfield, Tennessee, unincorporated community in Jackson County
 Mayfield, Utah
 Mayfield, Washington
 Mayfield, Wisconsin

Other uses
Mayfield, alternative name for the Marchfield (assembly)
Mayfield (company), a venture capital firm based in Menlo Park, California
Mayfield Consumer Products, a company that operates a candle-making factory struck by the 2021 Western Kentucky tornado
Mayfield (Leave It to Beaver), the fictional setting for the TV program Leave It to Beaver
Mayfield Dairy, a dairy run by Scottie Mayfield
Mayfield Psychiatric Hospital

See also
Mayfield Park (disambiguation)
Mayfield School (disambiguation)
Mayfield Township (disambiguation)
Mayfeld, a fictional character in the Star Wars franchise